The Women's 5 kilometre cross-country skiing event was part of the cross-country skiing programme at the 1964 Winter Olympics, in Innsbruck, Austria. It was the first appearance of the event. The competition was held on 5 February 1964, at the Cross Country Skiing Stadium.

Results

References

Women's cross-country skiing at the 1964 Winter Olympics
Women's 5 kilometre cross-country skiing at the Winter Olympics
Oly